Donggaodi Subdistrict is a subdistricts on the southeast of Fengtai District, Beijing, China. It is situated south of Nanyuan and Jiugong Townships, west and north of Jiugong Township, and east of Nanyuan Subdistrict. According to the 2020 census of China, Donggaodi has a total population of 42,705 under its jurisdiction.

The subdistrict was named Donggaodi in 1958 for its relatively elevated landscape compare to surrounding region.

History

Administrative Division 
In 2021, the subdistrict consists of 10 communities, which are listed in the table below:

Landmark 

 China Aerospace Museum

See also 

 List of township-level divisions of Beijing

References 

Fengtai District
Subdistricts of Beijing